Felix Manthey (24 October 1898 – 8 October 1971) was a German racing cyclist. He won the German National Road Race in 1928. He also rode in the 1930 Tour de France.

References

External links

1898 births
1971 deaths
German male cyclists
Cyclists from Berlin
German cycling road race champions
20th-century German people